Exochocepheus is a genus of mites in the family Scutoverticidae. There are about seven described species in Exochocepheus.

Species
These seven species belong to the genus Exochocepheus:
 Exochocepheus borealis (Rjabinin, 1984)
 Exochocepheus contiguus (Balogh & Csiszár, 1963)
 Exochocepheus eremitus Woolley & Higgins, 1968
 Exochocepheus hungaricus (Mahunka, 1987)
 Exochocepheus laticuspis (Balogh & Mahunka, 1965)
 Exochocepheus stenolamellatus (Golosova, 1984)
 Exochocepheus tuberculatus (Golosova, 1984)

References

Further reading

 

Acariformes
Articles created by Qbugbot